Tyarsh, Torsh, Tersh, Tarsh, Tershi is an aul in the Dzheyrakhsky District of Ingushetia. It is part of the rural settlement of Olgetti (administrative center rural settlement). Tyarsh is the ancestral aul of Ingush taïp Torshkhoy.

History 
Historically Tyarsh was part of the Fyappin society.

In 1810–1811 according to the testimony of representatives of the Ingush in connection with the entry of the latter into Russian citizenship. The statement lists 13 villages of mountainous Ingushetia, among them, is Tarsh (Tershi) in which there are 29 households.

One theory suggests that Tarskoye valley got its name from the village of Tyarsh in the Metskhal society.

Researchers have also found evidence of festivities in honor of the god Bolom-Dyal in the villages of Arzi, Tyarsh, Kelbizhti and the area of Makhate.

Medieval Era 
A large tower village of the castle type, Tyarsh was located on the spur of Mount Mat-Lam. The village was fortified with 3 combat, 3 semi-combat, and 8 residential towers, as well as stone defensive walls from the late Middle Ages. These towers were part of independent, but closely interconnected powerful castle complexes.

The Tyarsh village was known to be the origin of several prominent Ingush families, including the Tarshkhoevs, Daskievs, Daskhoevs, Marzabekovs, Polievs, Soslanovs, and Gudantovs.

Necropolis 

0.3 km south of Tyarsh, on a gentle mountain slope, there is a compact group of necropolis of seven above-ground collective crypts from the late Middle Ages of the 16th-18th centuries. However, these crypts were partially destroyed in 1944.

North and north-west of Tyarsh, there are ground crypt tombs and a late medieval core-shaped mausoleum with a round base and a cone-shaped top.

Geography 
Tyarsh is located on the spurs of the Rocky Range. The nearest villages: in the north - Guli, in the south-west - Olgeti.

References

Bibliography 
 
 

Rural localities in Ingushetia